Agamont Park (originally Bar Harbor Park) is an urban park in Bar Harbor, Maine, United States. It is located at the northern end of the town's Main Street, at its intersection with West Street. The park, set upon a hill, affords 180-degree views to the northwest, north, northeast, east and southeast, including that of Mount Desert Narrows, Frenchman Bay and its islands. As such, it is a popular viewing point for tourists.

Its entrance from Newport Drive, off Main Street, is marked by a water fountain, designed by Eric Sodderholtz. (Newport Drive is named for Newport House, a hotel which stood just south of the park between 1869 and 1938.)

In October 2013, The O'Reilly Factor sent one of its correspondents to Bar Harbor after the town council voted to remove a Wreaths Across America display that had been in the park since July 2011.

The park is a recommended viewpoint to watch the Fourth of July fireworks each year.

The park has a free Wi-Fi network.

Agamont House
The park stands on the former site of Agamont House (sometimes called Agamont Hotel), which was built in 1840 by Tobias Roberts. It was expanded into a hotel — the town's first — in 1855. The building burned down in 1888.

Gallery

See also
Village Green, Bar Harbor

References

External links
Public Parks - Town of Bar Harbor, Maine

Buildings and structures in Bar Harbor, Maine
Parks in Bar Harbor, Maine
Urban public parks